Daniel Veyt (born 9 December 1956) is a Belgian former footballer who played as a striker. He earned 12 caps for the Belgium national team, and played in the 1986 FIFA World Cup where Belgium finished fourth. During his club career he played for K.S.V. Waregem and R.F.C. de Liège.

Honours 
Waregem
 Belgian Cup: runner-up 1981–82
 Belgian Supercup: 1982
 UEFA Cup: 1985–86 (semi-finals)
Tournoi de Paris: 1985

Belgium
 FIFA World Cup: fourth place 1986

Individual
 Honorary citizen of Sint-Amands: 1986
 Belgian Fair Play Award: 1987

References

External links
 
 

1956 births
Living people
Belgian footballers
Association football forwards
Belgium international footballers
1986 FIFA World Cup players
Belgian Pro League players
K. Sint-Niklase S.K.E. players
RFC Liège players
K.A.A. Gent players
K.S.C. Lokeren Oost-Vlaanderen players
k. Boom F.C. players